Stanton Kidd (born March 18, 1992) is an American professional basketball player who plays for the Akita Northern Happinets of the Japanese B.League. He played college basketball for South Plains College, North Carolina Central University and Colorado State before playing professionally in Belgium, Germany, Turkey and for the Utah Jazz of the National Basketball Association (NBA).

Early life and college career
Kidd attended Edmondson-Westside High School in Baltimore, Maryland, where he averaged 23 points, 12 rebounds, and six assists in his senior year, leading the Red Storm to their first-ever Baltimore City Division I championship. Kidd was named the team MVP his senior season and earned all-metro player honors.

Kidd played two seasons at South Plains College, one of the top junior college programs in the nation, helping the Texans win the 2011-12 National Junior College Athletic Association National Championship going a perfect 36-0.

On March 10, 2013, Kidd was named First-team All-Mid-Eastern Athletic Conference in his first season at North Carolina Central University. He was third in the MEAC in scoring (14.5 points per game), eighth in rebounding (6.9 boards per game), fifth in field goal percentage (55.3 percent).

In his senior year at Colorado State, he averaged 11.5 points, 5 rebounds and 1.8 assists per game.

Professional career

Limburg United (2015–2016)
On July 27, 2015, Kidd started his professional career with the Belgian team Limburg United, signing a one-year deal. Kidd helped Limburg reach the 2016 Belgian League Semifinals where they eventually lost to Oostende.

Tigers Tübingen (2016–2017)
On July 21, 2016, Kidd signed with the German team Tigers Tübingen for the 2016–17 season. In 20 games played for Tübingen, he averaged 12.8 points, 4.6 rebounds, 1.7 assists and 1.2 steals per game.

Darüşşafaka (2017–2019)
On July 21, 2017, Kidd signed a two-year deal with the Turkish team Darüşşafaka. On January 14, 2018, Kidd tied his career-high 24 points without missing a single shot, shooting 9-of-9 from the field, along with seven rebounds in a 98–65 win over Gaziantep. Kidd went on to win the 2018 EuroCup title with Darüşşafaka.

On June 28, 2018, Kidd joined the Utah Jazz for the 2018 NBA Summer League, where he averaged 10.8 points and 3.3 rebounds in six games.

Utah Jazz (2019)
On July 17, 2019, Kidd signed a contract with the Utah Jazz after completing stints with them in the 2019 NBA Summer League. On November 21, he was waived by the Jazz after playing three games.

Melbourne United (2019–2020)
On December 20, 2019, Kidd signed with Melbourne United for the 2019–20 NBL season as an injury replacement for Casey Prather.

Ormanspor (2020–2021)
On August 18, 2020, Kidd signed with OGM Ormanspor of the Basketball Super League.

Hapoel Jerusalem (2021)
On February 18, 2021, he signed with Hapoel Jerusalem of the Israeli Basketball Premier League.

Lokomotiv Kuban (2021–2022)
On July 8, 2021, he has signed with Lokomotiv Kuban of the VTB United League.

Career statistics

NBA

Regular season

|-
| align="left" | 
| align="left" | Utah
| 4 || 0 || 3.8 || .000 || .000 || .000 || .8 || .3 || .0 || .0 || .0
|- class="sortbottom"
| style="text-align:center;" colspan=2| Career
| 4 || 0 || 3.8 || .000 || .000 || .000 || .8 || .3 || .0 || .0 || .0

EuroLeague

|-
| style="text-align:left;"| 2018–19
| style="text-align:left;"| Darüşşafaka
| 30 || 18 || 21.8 || .391 || .284 || .686 || 3.0 || 1.2 || .6 || .2 || 6.8 || 5.4
|- class="sortbottom"
| style="text-align:center;" colspan="2"| Career
| 30 || 18 || 21.8 || .391 || .284 || .686 || 3.0 || 1.2 || .6 || .2 || 6.8 || 5.4

EuroCup

|-
| style="text-align:left;background:#AFE6BA;"| 2017–18
| style="text-align:left;" rowspan=1| Darüşşafaka
| 22 || 6 || 17.1 || .598 || .463 || .937 || 8.5 || 7.6 || 2.2 || 1.1 || 8.4 || 9.9
|-
|- class="sortbottom"
| style="text-align:center;" colspan=2| Career
| 22 || 6 || 17.1 || .598 || .463 || .937 || 8.5 || 7.6 || 2.2 || 1.1 || 8.4 || 9.9

Source: RealGM

References

External links

 Colorado State Rams bio
 RealGM profile
 TBLStat.net Profile

1992 births
Living people
Akita Northern Happinets players
American expatriate basketball people in Australia
American expatriate basketball people in Belgium
American expatriate basketball people in Germany
American expatriate basketball people in Japan
American expatriate basketball people in Turkey
American men's basketball players
Basketball players from Baltimore
Colorado State Rams men's basketball players
Darüşşafaka Basketbol players
Limburg United players
Melbourne United players
North Carolina Central Eagles men's basketball players
OGM Ormanspor players
PBC Lokomotiv-Kuban players
Power forwards (basketball)
Small forwards
South Plains Texans basketball players
Tigers Tübingen players
Undrafted National Basketball Association players
Utah Jazz players